Vitalina is a feminine given name that may refer to the following notable people:
Vitalina Batsarashkina (born 1996), Russian sports shooter
Vitalina Koval, LGBTI human rights defender in Ukraine
Vitalina Simonova (born 1992), Russian breaststroke swimmer 
Vitalina Varela (born 1966), Cape Verdean actress

See also
Vitalina Varela, a 2019 Portuguese film